Roberto Vallone (1915–2001) was an Italian racing driver mostly known for his early association with Scuderia Ferrari.

He entered 13 sports car races (with 12 starts) between 1947 and 1953, mainly in a Stanguellini S1500 and Ferrari 166's that he entered as a privateer. His best season was 1949, when he won three races (the Grand Prix of Naples, Giro dell'Umbria and Coppa d' Oro delle Dolomiti) within four weeks.

Vallone also competed in two non-championship Formula 1 races (the Gran Premio di San Remo in 1949 and the V San Remo Grand Prix) in 1950. He also participated to a Formula Libre event and a Formula 2 race.

Prior to his career in motor racing, he had a brief spell in politics in his native Apulia, when he was mayor of Nardò, a suburb of Lecce. His wife was the artist Carla Lavatelli.

Complete results

References

 statsf1.com
 
 it.wikipedia.org
 jmfangio.org
 racingsportscars.com
 kolumbus.fi/leif.snellman 
 silhouet.com
 barchetta.cc/Ferrari 166MM
 barchetta.cc/Mille Miglia

Italian racing drivers
Mille Miglia drivers
2001 deaths
1915 births
Sportspeople from the Province of Lecce
20th-century Italian people